Canada is one of the largest agricultural producers and exporters in the world. As with other developed nations, the proportion of the population agriculture employed and agricultural GDP as a percentage of the national GDP fell dramatically over the 20th century, but it remains an important element of the Canadian economy.
A wide range of agriculture is practised in Canada, from sprawling wheat fields of the prairies to summer produce of the Okanagan valley. In the federal government, overview of Canadian agriculture is the responsibility of the Department of Agriculture and Agri-Food.

Major agricultural products

Various factors affect the socio-economic characteristics of Canadian agriculture. The 2006 Census of Agriculture listed seven: Quantity and type of farms; Biogeography: crop and land use areas; land management practices; Quantity of livestock and poultry; Agricultural engineering: Farm machinery and equipment; Farm capital; Farm operating expenses and receipts; Farm-related injuries.

Early in the 21st century, Canadian agronomists were aware of 48 "primary grain, vegetable and fruit crops", based on surface area and value. In 2007, the Canadian Federation of Agriculture broke down into five primary "production sectors" Canadian agriculture according to cash receipts:
grains and oilseeds: 34%
red meats – livestock: 24%
dairy: 12%
horticulture: 9%
poultry and eggs: 8%

In 2018, Canada was the world's largest producer of rapeseed (20.3 million tonnes), dry pea (3.5 million tonnes) and lentil (2 million tons), the 2nd largest producer of oats in the world (3.4 million tons), the 6th largest world producer of wheat (31.7 million tons) and barley (8.3 million tons), the 7th largest world producer of soy (7.2 million tons), the 10th largest world producer of maize (13.8 million tons) and the 12th largest world producer of potato (5.7 million tonnes). In the same year, the country also produced 688 thousand tons of flax, 505 thousand tons of sugar beet (which is used to produce sugar), 497 thousand tons of tomato, 424 thousand tons of apple, 354 thousand tons of carrots, 341 thousand tons of beans, 311 thousand tons of chickpeas, 236 thousand tons of rye, 240 thousand tons of onion, 219 thousand tons of cabbage, 195 thousand tons of cranberry, 164 thousand tons of blueberry, 173 thousand tons of mustard seed, 138 thousand tons of mushroom and truffle, 120 thousand tons of grape, in addition to smaller productions of other agricultural products.

Grains and oilseeds

In 1925, Saskatchewan produced over half of the wheat in the Dominion of Canada, threshing more than 240,000,000 bushels (6,500,000 metric tons) of wheat. Rapeseed, alfalfa, barley, canola, flax, rye, and oats are other popularly grown grain crops.

Wheat is a staple crop from Canada. To help homesteaders attain an abundance harvest in a foreshortened growing season, varieties of wheat were developed at the beginning of the 20th century. Red Fife was the first strain; it was a wheat which could be seeded in the fall and sprout in the early spring. Red Fife ripened nearly two weeks sooner and was a harder wheat than other spring wheats. Dr. C. Saunders, experimented further with Red Fife, and developed Mini Wheats, which was resistant to rust and came to maturity within 100 days. Some other types of wheat grown are durum, spelt, and winter wheat. In recent years, Canadian farmers have also begun to grow rice.

The Prairie Farm Rehabilitation Administration (PFRA) was established in 1935 to provide Federal financial assistance in regard to the global economical crisis. The PFRA provides farmers with land and water resources such as irrigation, soil drifting conservation and small farm water development. The Farm credit program has established the Canadian Farm Loan Act to provide stock bonds and farm improvement loans.

Livestock

115,000 cattle roamed the southern prairies by 1900.
Livestock can include the raising of cows, also commonly called cattle. Recently domestication of the buffalo and elk has initiated a new food industry.  Sheep have been raised for both wool and meat. Bovine or pig barns have been a part of livestock culture. Scientists have been making forward steps in swine research giving rise to intensive pig farming. The domestication of various farm animals meant that corresponding industries such as feedlots, animal husbandry and meat processing have also been studied, and developed. Two corporations (Cargill Foods and Brazil-based multinational JBS) control 80 percent of beef processing, and four retailers capture 72 percent of retail sales. 

From 1921 to 2011, farming operations have become more intensive and specialized. The total number of animal farms in Canada went from 8.1 per 100 inhabitants to 0.6 per 100 inhabitants. During this period, the number of Canadian pigs rose from 3,324,291 to 12,679,104, while the number of pig farms dropped from 452,935 to 7,371. In 2011, the hog industry was the fourth largest in Canada, after canola, dairy products and cattle, with cash receipts of $3.9 billion. The size of farms had also increased substantially, with the national average rising to 1,720 hogs per operation in 2011.

Dairy farming

Like poultry, dairy farming in Canada is restricted under the system of supply management. In 2016 there were approximately 17,840 dairy cattle and milk production farm operators in Canada.

Horticulture

Horticulture crops, which includes nursery, flowers and fruits, became easier to grow with the development of plant hardiness zones.
Apples, pears, plums and prunes, peaches, apricots, cherries, strawberries, raspberries, loganberries and fruit orchards are numerous and reach commercial size in the Annapolis Valley of Nova Scotia, New Brunswick, Quebec, Niagara Peninsula and Norfolk County of Ontario and Okanagan Valley of British Columbia.

Hazelnuts are harvested in Eastern Canada and British Columbia. Maple syrup and maple sugar, maple butter, and maple taffy are products of Quebec along the St. Lawrence River. The main market for Canadian maple syrup and sugar is the United States. Potatoes are an abundant harvest of the Maritime provinces. Sugar beets and beet root sugar are harvested in Quebec, Ontario, Manitoba, and Alberta.

Viticulture

Viticulture refers to the growing of grapes for the production of wine. Ontario, and British Columbia are the two largest wine-growing regions in Canada, although grapes are also grown in other regions of Canada, including Quebec, and the Maritimes. In 2015, Canada produced 56.2 million litres of wine. Approximately 62 per cent of all wines produced that year originated from Ontario, while wineries from British Columbia constituted 33 per cent of that years wine production. Canada is the largest producer of ice wine, producing more ice wine than all other countries combined.

In 2015, there were 548 wineries spread across . More than half of Canada's vineyard acreage is situated in Ontario, with 150 vineyards spread across . British Columbia holds 240 wineries, spread throughout . There are 138 wineries in Quebec, which manage  of vineyards in the province. Nova Scotia holds 20 wineries, which manages  of vineyards in the province.

Poultry and eggs

Fowl, poultry, eggs, chickens, geese, ducks and turkeys are part of a system of supply management. Under supply management, production is limited, prices are raised, and competition is severely curtailed, raising profits for farmers through artificially high prices for poultry and eggs paid by consumers. There are around 3,000 poultry farmers and 1,000 egg farmers in Canada.

Aquaculture

191,259 tonnes of aquatic life were killed in Canadian aquaculture systems in 2018. The total aquaculture production was worth 1.43 billion dollars.

Fur

Mink and foxes are farmed in Canada for their fur. The total value of mink pelts produced in 2018 was 44 million dollars. This value included pelts taken from animals that died and spring peltings.

Other
In recent years farmers have been producing alternative crops which are economically viable, and amongst these are organic farm crops.  Hemp and wool from sheep are the main areas of fibre production of Canada.  Wool production was on average 16,022,000 pounds (7,267 t) in the 1930s and 9,835,000 pounds (4,461 t) in 1949.. Fibre flax from flaxseed has been exported to the United Kingdom. Crop growers may supplement their income with beeswax and honey and learn beekeeping. Enterprising land owners have had success growing as well as packaging and marketing the sunflower seed. Crops are not only for human consumption but also for animal consumption, which opens a new market such as canary seed. Cuniculture, or rabbit farming, is another livestock enterprise. Cannabis is an important crop in some areas, making up 5% of British Columbia's GDP. According to BC Business Magazine, the crop is worth $7.5 billion to the province annually, and gives employment to 250,000 people.

Number of farms by Province/Territory

Canadian agricultural government departments
The Constitution Act, 1867 states each province has jurisdiction over agriculture, it also vests concurrent jurisdiction in the federal government. Newfoundland agricultural affairs were dealt with by the Agricultural Division of the Department of Natural Resources at Confederation.

The Constitution also states that the federal Government has sole authority in coastal and inland fishery matters. Provinces have rights over non-tidal waters and fishing practices there only.

Agricultural economy

Canadian farms, fisheries and ranches produce a wide variety of crops, livestock, food, feed, fibre, fuel and other goods by the systematic raising of plants and animals which are dependent upon the geography of the province. As of 2002, wheat constituted the largest crop area at 12.6%. Canadian farmers received a record $36.3 billion in 2001 from livestock, crop sales and program payments. In 2001, the accrued net income of farm operators from farm production amounted to 1,633 million dollars, which amounts to 0.147% of Canada's gross domestic product at market prices which is 1,108,200 million dollars. Fisheries are also playing an important role while forestry plays a secondary role. Canada's evolution has abandoned subsistence techniques and now sees a mere 3% of Canada's population employed as a mechanized industrial farmer who are able feed the rest of the nation's population of 30,689.0 thousand people (2001) as well as export to foreign markets. (Canada's estimated population was 32,777,300 on 1 January 2007).

Trade
The marketing and economic movement of Canada's various agriculture commodities has been a challenge. Domestic trade encompasses providing goods within Canada provincially and inter-provincial. Support agencies and services such as storage, railways, warehouses, stores, banking institutions all affect domestic trade. Trade of wheat from the Canada's prairies was monitored by the Canadian Wheat Board (CWB) prior to the privatization and sale of the CWB to foreign interests in 2015. Canada's depression of 1882–1897 brought a low of 64¼ cents per bushel ($24/t) as of 1893. This era during Laurier's administration saw thousands of homesteads cancelled. Wheat prices soared during World War I. In 1928, Canada exported high quantities of wheat, flour, and goods. The depression took its toll on Canada as exports sunk to approximately 40% of their 1928 amount. European markets stopped needing to import Canadian wheat as they started growing their own varieties, and then World War II events put a blockade on trade to European markets. Canada became more of an industrial entity during the time of this industrial revolution, and less of an agricultural nation. Following World War II the United Kingdom entered into contract for a large amount of agricultural commodities such as bacon, cheese, wheat, oats and barley. After the United Kingdom, the United States is Canada's largest external trade partner. Between 1943 and 1953, the average export of Canadian wheat was 347,200,000 bushels (9,449,000 t). The three-year International Wheat Agreement of 1955, which really lasted 6 years, included exports of wheat or flour to 28 of 44 importing countries including Germany, Japan, Belgium, UK, and the Netherlands.

Agribusiness
Agribusiness are activities of food and fibre production and processing which are not part of the farm operation. This would include the production of farm equipment and fertilizers to aid farm production. Agribusiness also includes the firms that purchase the raw goods from the farm for further processing. The meat packing industry, flour mill, and canning industry would be included in the agribusiness sector processing farm products.
A recent growth area in agribusiness is the advent of organized farmland investment funds operating on the model of direct land ownership with rental back to farmers as operators.

Industry categories
According to Agriculture and Agri-Food Canada, these are the classifications of Canadian Agriculture Industries.

Agricultural science
Agricultural science began developing new styles of farming and strains of wheat and crops so that farming could become a successful venture.   Farming methods were developed at places such as Dominion Experimental Farm, Rosthern Experimental Station, and Bell Farm. From 1914 to 1922, the Better Farming Train travelled around rural of Saskatchewan areas educating pioneer farmers.
The 1901 census showed 511,100 farms and the number of farms peaked in 1941 at a record 732,800 farms. The industrial revolution modernised the farming industry as mechanized vehicles replaced the oxen ploughed land or the horse-drawn cart. Farms became much larger, and mechanized evolving towards industrial agriculture.

Production

Farming activities were very labour-intensive before the industrial revolution and the advent of tractors, combines, balers, etc. From the late 19th century to the mid-20th century, a great percentage of the Canadian labour force was engaged in high labour, smaller farming practices. After mechanization, scientific advancement, improved marketing practices farms became more efficient, larger and less labour-intensive. The labour population was freed up and went to industry, government, transportation, trade and finance. Agriculture, stock raising and horticulture employed one-fourth of the Canadian population according to the 1951 census as well as providing products for exports and Canadian manufacturing concerns.

Farm equipment

The Oliver Chilled Plow, which could cut through the prairie sod, was in use by 1896. Binders which could cut and tie grain for the harvest season and grain elevators for storage were introduced in the late 19th century as well. Plows, tractors, spreaders, combines to name a few are some mechanized implements for the grain crop or horticultural farmer which are labour saving devices. Many Canadian museums such as Reynolds-Alberta Museum will showcase the evolution and variety of farm machinery.

Challenges
The Great Depression and drought of the Dirty Thirties was devastating. The drought resulted in a mass exodus of population from the prairies, as well as new agricultural practices such as soil conservation, and crop rotation.

The use of soil conservation practices such as crop rotation, cover crops, and windbreaks was expanded following the drought experiences of the dirty thirties. Literally layers and layers of topsoil would be blowing away during this time. Bow River Irrigation Project, Red Deer River Project and the St. Mary Irrigation project of Alberta, were a few of the major projects undertaken by the Prairie Farm Rehabilitation Act (P.F.R.A.) resulting in reservoirs, and distribution systems. A current project is soil liming at the Land Resource Research Institute.
Wheat diseases such as wheat bunt and stinking smut can be successfully treated with a fungicide.
Disease of plants and animals can break an agricultural producer.  Tuberculosis in animals was an early threat, and cattle needed to be tested, and areas accredited in 1956. The newer disease such as chronic wasting disease or transmissible spongiform encephalopathy (TSE) affects both elk and deer. Elk and deer raising is a pioneer field of domestication, has had a setback with this disease. Mad cow disease in cattle and scrapie of sheep are monitored by the Canadian Food Inspection Agency. The poultry sector was plagued by Pullorum disease, and by controlling the flock via poultry husbandry, this disease has been brought under control.

Plants whose traits can be modified to survive a disease or insect have made inroads into Canadian agricultural practices. Cereal rusts which can destroy the majority of areas seeded to wheat, was controlled in 1938 by breeding strains which were rust-resistant. This strain was successful until around 1950, when again a new variety of rust broke out, and again a new species of wheat called Selkirk was developed which was rust resistant. Biotechnology is the center of new research and regulations affecting agriculture this century.

Developmental and educational institutions
To increase the viability of agriculture as an economic lifestyle several improvements have been made by various nationwide educational facilities. Inroads and innovations have been made in the diverse fields of agricultural science, agricultural engineering, agricultural soil science, Sustainable agriculture, Agricultural productivity, agronomy, biodiversity, bioengineering, irrigation and swine research for example.  Canadian universities conducting agricultural research include McGill University, Dalhousie University, Université Laval, Université de Montréal, University of Alberta, University of British Columbia, University of Calgary, University of Guelph, University of Manitoba, University of Saskatchewan and University of Prince Edward Island.   The Ontario Agricultural College is located at the University of Guelph and the Western College of Veterinary Medicine is located at the University of Saskatchewan. The Atlantic Veterinary College is located at the University of P.E.I. and there are also faculties of veterinary medicine at the University of Calgary and Université de Montréal. BC Agriculture in the Classroom Foundation operates in the province of British Columbia.

Agricultural Museums

 Canada Agriculture Museum
 Manitoba Agricultural Museum
 Ross Farm Museum
 Central Experimental Farm
 Ontario Agricultural Museum
 Saskatchewan Western Development Museum

See also

 History of agriculture in Canada
 Canadian Census of Agriculture
 Canadian Agricultural Safety Association
 Pesticides in Canada

References

Further reading

External links

 Agriculture and Agri-Food Canada / Agriculture et Agroalimentaire
 Agriculture - Province of B.C.
 Canada Agriculture Museum
 Soil to Sky: Careers in Canadian Agriculture in Food
 The Archives of Ontario Celebrates Our Agricultural Past, online exhibit on Archives of Ontario website